Villa de Soto Airport  is a public use airport located  south of Villa de Soto (es), a town on the Avalos River in the Córdoba of Argentina. The runway lies alongside Provincial Route 15.

See also

Transport in Argentina
List of airports in Argentina

References

External links 
OpenStreetMap - Villa de Soto Airport

Airports in Argentina
Córdoba Province, Argentina